A primary carbon is a carbon atom which is bound to only one other carbon atom. It is thus at the end of a carbon chain. In case of an alkane, three hydrogen atoms are bound to a primary carbon (see propane in the figure on the right). A hydrogen atom could also be replaced by a hydroxy group, which would make the molecule a primary alcohol.

References 

Chemical nomenclature
Organic chemistry